Valentin Kulev (born July 10, 1948) is a Russian former handball player who competed for the Soviet Union in the 1972 Summer Olympics.

In 1972 he was part of the Soviet team which finished fifth. He played all six matches and scored 13 goals.

External links
profile

1948 births
Living people
Soviet male handball players
Russian male handball players
Handball players at the 1972 Summer Olympics
Olympic handball players of the Soviet Union